Riedern is a former municipality in the canton of Glarus in Switzerland. Effective from 1 January 2011, Riedern is part of the municipality of Glarus.

History

Riedern is first mentioned in 1350 as Riedern.

Geography

Of this area, 23.8% is used for agricultural purposes, while 53.6% is forested. Of the rest of the land, 13.2% is settled (buildings or roads) and the remainder (9.3%) is non-productive (rivers, glaciers or mountains).

Riedern is at the entrance to the Klöntal and is north-west of Glarus.

Demographics
Riedern had a population (as of 2010) of 734.  , 16.3% of the population was made up of foreign nationals.  Over the last 10 years the population has grown at a rate of 13.8%.  Most of the population speaks German  (82.3%), with Italian being second most common ( 8.4%) and Turkish being third ( 4.5%).

In the 2007 federal election the most popular party was the SPS which received 49% of the vote.  Most of the rest of the votes went to the SVP with 39.6% of the vote.

About 62.4% of the population (between age 25-64) have completed either non-mandatory upper secondary education or additional higher education (either University or a Fachhochschule).

Riedern has an unemployment rate of 2.31%.  , there were 12 people employed in the primary economic sector and about 5 businesses involved in this sector.  41 people are employed in the secondary sector and there are 7 businesses in this sector.  35 people are employed in the tertiary sector, with 13 businesses in this sector.

The historical population is given in the following table:

References

Former municipalities of the canton of Glarus